Keet Oldenbeuving (born 1 September 2004) is a Dutch skateboarder.

She is the youngest Dutch athlete at the 2020 Summer Olympics. Together with the Dutch oldest sprinter Churandy Martina she was the flagbearer at the 2020 Summer Olympics Parade of Nations during the opening ceremony.

She competed in the women’s street event at the 2020 Summer Olympics.

References 

2004 births
Living people
Dutch skateboarders
Female skateboarders
Olympic skateboarders of the Netherlands
Place of birth missing (living people)
Skateboarders at the 2020 Summer Olympics